Alikoirah as a place name may refer to:
 Alikoirah (Alif Alif Atoll) (Republic of Maldives)
 Alikoirah (Alif Dhaal Atoll) (Republic of Maldives)